The men's 100 metres T38 took place in Stadium Australia.

There were two heats and one final round. The T38 is for athletes who have mild cerebral palsy or similar disabilities.

Heats

Heat 1

Heat 2

Final round

References

Athletics at the 2000 Summer Paralympics